Pure Country: Pure Heart is a 2017 American country musical directed by Damon Santostefano. The film tells story of teenage sisters who go to Nashville when they discover their late father was a country music singer. It is a sequel to the 1992 film Pure Country and to the 2010 film Pure Country 2: The Gift.

Plot
Ada Spencer and her younger sister, Piper, are high schoolers living in a rural Tennessee farmhouse with their widowed mother Elizabeth and their grandmother, Meemaw. When a water pipe bursts, the girls find a Silver Star and other information about their father, whom their mother never talks about. Over the next few days, the girls repeatedly lie and say they are going to the farm of Ada's friend, Justine, but actually catch rides with Justine to go learn more about their father.

At the nearby State Veteran's Home, they meet Iraq War veteran Henry Monroe, who tells them about serving in the Marines with their father in 2004, when their father saved his live by jumping on a grenade. They also meet C.J. Simms, a Korean War veteran and musician who is impressed by their singing voices.

They learn that their father had been a country music singer, so they travel to Nashville to learn more about him. They meet Declan, who soon strikes up a relationship with Ada. Declan helps them meet Marq Dunn, the lady with whom their father had written and recorded his music. After hearing them sing, Marq invites them back to Nashville to record a song.

The sisters get in trouble when Elizabeth finally learns that they have been lying about their whereabouts. They respond that their mother is a liar for never telling them the truth about their father's music and military careers. Eventually Meemaw reveals that their father had stopped his music, of his own accord, when he met Elizabeth and wanted to start a family.

Elizabeth visits Marq, reconciling with her and admitting that she always felt a little jealous, but also a little guilty about taking Brian away from the musical opportunities he and Marq could have had. leading to Ada and Piper singing one of their father's songs, on stage with Willie Nelson and Marq, at a fund raiser for veterans.

Cast

 Kaitlyn Bausch as Ada Spencer
 Cozi Zuehlsdorff as Piper Spencer
 Dara Sisterhen as Justine Sloan
 Amanda Detmer as Elizabeth Spencer
 Laura Bell Bundy as Marq Dunn
 Matthew Barnes as Declan Martino
 Myra Turley as Meemaw
 Lawrence Turner as Henry Monroe
 Ronny Cox as CJ Simms
 Willie Nelson as himself

Soundtrack

Track listing
 Keep Asking Why – Kate York
 Stand By Me – Kaitlyn Bausch, Cozi Zuehlsdorff
 Slide – Kaitlyn Bausch, Cozi Zuehlsdorff
 Silver City – Ronny Cox
 Sing A Little Higher – Matthew Barnes
 The Grass Ain’t Greener – Laura Bell Bundy
 Pass It On – Mostly Monas
 We Don't Run – Kaitlyn Bausch, Cozi Zuehlsdorff
 Nobody's Stranger Anymore – Kaitlyn Bausch, Cozi Zuehlsdorff
 Hold On To Hope – Kaitlyn Bausch, Cozi Zuehlsdorff
 Lean On You – Cassidy Ford, Casey Black
 Like a Country Boy – Dallas Davidson
 We Don't Run – Willie Nelson feat. Kaitlyn Bausch, Cozi Zuehlsdorff, Laura Bell Bundy
 Something Calling My Name – Jill Andrews

External links
 
 

Films directed by Damon Santostefano
Warner Bros. direct-to-video films
Direct-to-video sequel films
WWE Studios films
Country music films
2010s English-language films